Jamie Leslie Guy (born 1 August 1987) is an English former professional footballer who played as a forward .

He enjoyed a six-year career with Colchester United between 2004 and 2010, playing on loan for Tiptree United, Gravesend & Northfleet, Cambridge United, Oxford United, Dagenham & Redbridge, and Port Vale. Following a brief spell with Conference club Grays Athletic in 2010, he moved on to Braintree Town of the Conference South. He won promotion in his first season with the club, but suffered a double open fractured leg in a match against Eastleigh. He played on loan at Thurrock in 2011–12 to aid his recovery. He later played for non-League sides Maldon & Tiptree, Needham Market, Heybridge Swifts, Bishop's Stortford, Witham Town, Billericay Town, Brentwood Town, VCD Athletic, Great Wakering Rovers, Stanway Rovers, Ware, Holland, Walthamstow, Debenham LC and Witham Town.

Career

Colchester United
Guy grew up in the East End of London and studied at Eastbrook Comprehensive School – also the school of Tony Adams and Paul Konchesky. A former under-15 player at West Ham United, he joined the Colchester United youth team, turning professional at the club in 2004. At the start of the 2004–05 season, Guy joined non-league Tiptree United on a one-month loan. He came through the ranks at parent club Colchester to make his senior debut at Layer Road in a 1–0 defeat to Blackpool on 5 February 2005. He replaced Sam Stockley on 82 minutes. Three weeks later he played the last two minutes of a 2–0 defeat away at Hull City, this time coming on for Gareth Williams.

Starting the 2005–06 with a couple of late minute appearances, Guy joined Gravesend & Northfleet on loan for October. Coming on for Kim Grant 65 minutes into a 2–2 draw with York City at Stonebridge Road, he played no further part of the club's Conference National campaign. Back with Colchester, he got his first start in a League Trophy game at Milton Keynes Dons, though made way for Greg Halford on 70 minutes. In February, he returned to the Conference, on loan with Cambridge United. He bagged his first goal in a 1–0 defeat of Woking on 4 March and on 4 April scored a last minute winning goal at the Abbey Stadium against Exeter City. He spent mid-March back at Layer Road, playing both legs of the League Trophy Southern Final clash with eventual winners Swansea City.

He spent all of the 2006–07 season with Colchester, who by now were in the Championship. He scored his first senior goal in the 2–1 defeat to West Bromwich Albion on 19 August, scoring seconds after coming on for Kemal Izzet. Becoming something of a "super-sub", he also scored late goals against Coventry City and league leaders Cardiff City, with the Cardiff game a particular highlight as he came on with the game at 1–1 and he played a key part in winning a penalty as well as scoring the second goal himself. Colchester ended the 2006–07 campaign in tenth-place, the best league finish in the club's history. Overall his stats of 34 appearances that season betray the fact that he rarely played more than 20 minutes of each match. In July, he signed an extended contract with the club. The following season he was called on less frequently, making just 12 appearances. In June 2007, Guy was forced to pay a £550 fine after pleading guilty to creating a disturbance in the Colchester town centre the previous month. He also received a twelve-month ban for drink driving in July 2008 and a £100 fine for "play" fighting with a friend in a car park.

In need of regular football, the young striker joined Conference outfit Oxford United on a season-long loan deal from Colchester United in July 2008. During the pre-season, Guy was in fine form, giving manager Darren Patterson cause for optimism. Guy claimed the dressing room atmosphere was a key reason for the impressive summer run. However, in a pre-season friendly with Portsmouth he suffered a hamstring injury, before being struck down by a minor ankle injury. These injuries frustrated attempts to build a strike partnership with James Constable. Following Patterson's departure in late November, Guy was unsure of his future at the Kassam Stadium. A few days later he scored two goals in a game for the first time, in the FA Trophy game with Sudbury and was well fancied by caretaker manager Jim Smith. However, with Chris Wilder's entrance came Guy's departure, as he was recalled to Layer Road at the end of the year. After four games under new Colchester manager Paul Lambert, he joined League Two promotion hopefuls Dagenham & Redbridge, initially on a one-month loan. He made his debut for the club the same evening as he signed, coming on as a late substitute in a 3–0 home defeat to Lincoln City on 3 March. After scoring the only goal in a league match against Port Vale at Vale Park seven days later, the "Daggers" were keen to extend the deal to the end of the season, which Colchester duly obliged to.

In July 2009, he joined Port Vale on trial, in view of a loan move for the start of the 2009–10 season. Guy was especially keen on a possible move, saying "Hopefully we can get something worked out and I can come in on loan and do a job for Port Vale." The deal fell through after Guy tore a cartilage in his knee, requiring surgery to correct the damage. In September 2009, Guy pled guilty to threatening behavior and was given a £350 fine, with £200 costs and compensation. The charges came following a night out where he got into an argument with former girlfriend, "spat in her face and pulled her around by her hair, causing a clump of her hair to come out". The loan deal went ahead the following month, lasting until January 2010. However the deal was cut short in November, after five games.

Non-League
On 19 January 2010, he had his contract at Colchester ended by mutual consent, and signed for Conference National side Grays Athletic two days later. He was released at the end of the 2009–10 season, and subsequently signed for Conference South club Braintree Town in July 2010. Braintree enjoyed an extremely successful season, winning promotion to the Conference National as champions of the Conference South. However it was a disastrous season for Guy, who suffered a catalogue in injuries, culminating in a broken leg that left his career in jeopardy. During pre-season he was struck with an ankle injury after he broke a bone in the joint. Poor pitch quality was a factor in the injury. Yet he made an early recovery to return to fitness by August, before later suffering a hamstring injury. The broken leg incident occurred in February following a collision with Eastleigh goalkeeper Gareth Barfoot; Guy was left with a double open leg fracture and broken tibia and fibula. The injury was so severe that Braintree manager Rod Stringer stressed that the first priority was making sure Guy could regain the ability to walk properly. Stringer blamed both the poor quality pitch and the recklessness of Barfoot's challenge, and stated that "it was probably the worst injury I've seen, at any club I've been at." Braintree Town and Colchester United organized a benefit match for Guy on 16 July 2011 at Cressing Road, as Guy began a lengthy rehabilitation period.

He joined Conference South club Thurrock on a one-month loan in November 2011. Upon his return to Cressing Road he pledged to repay Braintree for standing by him during his recovery. Guy signed with Isthmian League side Maldon & Tiptree in August 2012. He helped the club to a second-place finish in Division One North in 2012–13, though they lost the play-off final to Thamesmead Town. He signed with league rivals Needham Market on a two-year contract in summer 2013. He was transfer listed in December by manager Mark Morsley, who said "It's more to do with the way we play and our style which is not always suiting Jamie."

In January 2014, he signed for Heybridge Swifts. He signed with Bishop's Stortford of the Conference South in June 2014, having rejected an approach from Witham Town. He went on to re-sign with Grays Athletic 15 August, having failed to make a competitive appearance for Bishop's Stortford. Guy left Grays in December 2014, having scored eight goals in 24 appearances in all competitions. He then joined Witham Town on 8 December, and Harlow Town in March 2015. In July 2015 Guy signed for Isthmian League side Billericay Town, Brentwood Town in August 2015, and Heybridge Swifts again in December 2015. In June 2016, he was handed a suspended prison sentence after he pled guilty to assault by beating (common assault) and using violence to secure entry to a property after an attack on his then-girlfriend five months earlier. In August 2016 he joined VCD Athletic, and in January 2017 league rivals Great Wakering Rovers before returning to VCD Athletic in March 2017.

Former Colchester United teammate Kemal Izzet, now manager of Eastern Counties League side Stanway Rovers, signed Guy in June 2017. On 18 November 2017, he made his debut for Ware in the Isthmian League North Division. He was released the following month, as Craig Edwards took over the manager role of the club. He re-united with Holland joint-manager and former Stanway Rovers coach Jon Willis, as he made his debut for Eastern Counties League Division One club Holland in a 3–1 defeat at Framlingham Town on 6 January 2018.

He also featured for Sunday league team Marquis of the Colchester & District Football League during the 2017–18 season.

In June 2018, he joined Walthamstow of the Essex Senior League. On 21 September 2018, he signed for Debenham LC of the Eastern Counties League Division One North. Guy then rejoined Witham Town in July 2019 and manager Marc Benterman said Guy was considerably fitter than he was during his first spell at the club.

Career statistics

Honours
Braintree Town
Conference South: 2010–11

References

1987 births
Living people
Footballers from Barking, London
English footballers
Association football forwards
Colchester United F.C. players
Tiptree United F.C. players
Ebbsfleet United F.C. players
Cambridge United F.C. players
Oxford United F.C. players
Dagenham & Redbridge F.C. players
Port Vale F.C. players
Grays Athletic F.C. players
Braintree Town F.C. players
Thurrock F.C. players
Maldon & Tiptree F.C. players
Needham Market F.C. players
Heybridge Swifts F.C. players
Bishop's Stortford F.C. players
Witham Town F.C. players
Harlow Town F.C. players
Billericay Town F.C. players
Brentwood Town F.C. players
VCD Athletic F.C. players
Great Wakering Rovers F.C. players
Stanway Rovers F.C. players
Ware F.C. players
Holland F.C. players
Walthamstow F.C. players
Debenham LC F.C. players
English Football League players
National League (English football) players
Isthmian League players
Eastern Counties Football League players